Delhi Aerodrome  is a registered aerodrome located adjacent to Delhi, Ontario, Canada.

References

Registered aerodromes in Ontario
Buildings and structures in Norfolk County, Ontario
Transport in Norfolk County, Ontario